Noel Duignan (born December 20, 1948) is former politician in Ontario, Canada. He was a New Democratic Party member of the Legislative Assembly of Ontario from 1990 to 1995.

Background
Before running for office, Duignan was an executive assistant to federal New Democratic Party MPs Derek Blackburn and Lyle Kristiansen. He is a recipient of the Canada Medal.

Politics
Duignan was elected to the Ontario legislature in the 1990 provincial election, defeating incumbent Liberal Walt Elliot by 548 votes in the riding of Halton North. The NDP won a majority government and Duignan served as a parliamentary assistant to the Minister of Consumer and Commercial Relations from 1993 to 1995.

In 1994, Duignan sponsored a private member's bill that banned landfills on the Niagara Escarpment. He said, "The Niagara Escarpment is simply the wrong place to put a landfill."
 
In the 1995 provincial election Duignan was defeated finishing third against Progressive Conservative candidate Ted Chudleigh. He ran for re-election in the 1999 provincial election in the riding of Dufferin—Peel—Wellington—Grey, but finished third against Progressive Conservative incumbent David Tilson. He was also a candidate of the federal NDP in the 2004 Canadian election, but finished third against Conservative Michael Chong in the riding of Wellington—Halton Hills.

Later life
Duignan trained in mediation with J.P. Ryan and Associates and the Law Society of Upper Canada and is a member of mediate.ca. He works as a housing consultant and is a director of Brant Alcove Rehabilitation Services, a drug and alcohol rehabilitation centre based in Brantford, Ontario. Duignan is also a member of Family Mediation Canada, the Ontario Association for Family Mediation, Conflict Resolution Network Canada, and the Co-Operative Housing Federation of Canada. He lives in Georgetown, Ontario.

Electoral record

References

External links

1948 births
Living people
Ontario New Democratic Party MPPs
New Democratic Party candidates for the Canadian House of Commons
Ontario candidates for Member of Parliament